Rarick is a surname of German origin, and an Americanized spelling of Röhrich. People with this name include:

Cindy Rarick (born 1959), American golfer
Jason Rarick (born 1969), American politician
John Rarick (1924–2009), American lawyer and judge
Phillip J. Rarick (born 1940), American judge

References

Surnames of German origin